Təngivan (also, Tangevan and Tankivan) is a village in the Lankaran Rayon of Azerbaijan.  The village forms part of the municipality of Şovu.

References 

Populated places in Lankaran District